Shmuel Shilo or Shmulik Shiloh (1 December 1929 – 4 October 2011) was an Israeli actor, director and producer, born in the Second Polish Republic, and best remembered for his role on the Israeli production of Rechov Sumsum, a popular TV show based on Sesame Street. In 1983 he founded the Negev Theatre and served as its creative director for fifteen years.

Life

Shmuel Shilo was born in Łuck, eastern Poland (now Lutsk, Ukraine). Following the Nazi-Soviet invasion of Poland and the creation of the Łuck Ghetto by the German occupation authorities in December 1941, Shmuel (Shmulik, age twelve) was interned in the ghetto along with his family and 20,000 other Polish Jews. He survived the ghetto liquidation action of August 19, 1942 in a cellar with his mother and siblings, and the subsequent deportation to Górka Połonka killing fields, but all alone on September 12, to join the slave workers in a Nazi labor camp set up at the Jewish school building. He escaped once more, during a prisoner revolt by hiding under a work bench, and survived the war in the forests amongst partisans. After reuniting with his sister rescued by the Poles, in 1946 the two made their way to Palestine. He was a member of Palmach and was a founding member of Kibbutz Tze'elim.

Shilo studied acting and performed regularly in several theatres. In 1983 he founded the Negev Theatre and served as its art director until 1997. He also acted in several films and television series, best known for his role on the Israeli production of Sesame Street, Rechov Sumsum. He died of cancer at the age of 82.

Filmography

References

1929 births
2011 deaths
Jewish Israeli male actors
Jewish Polish male actors
Israeli people of Polish-Jewish descent
Polish emigrants to Mandatory Palestine
Israeli male stage actors
Israeli male film actors
Israeli male television actors
Israeli theatre directors
Palmach members
Nazi-era ghetto inmates
Place of birth missing
Place of death missing
Deaths from cancer in Israel
Holocaust survivors